Laurence Andretto (born 14 May 1973) is a former professional tennis player from France.

Biography
Andretto was born in the city of Revin in the Ardennes, near the Belgian border, the daughter of parents who were both teachers.

A right-handed player, she competed in the main draw of the French Open every year from 1997 to 2002. On two occasions she reached the second round, the first time in the 1998 edition when she overcame then world number 33 María Vento-Kabchi, then again in 2001 against the same opponent. She was a regular competitor in the qualifying draws of grand slam tournaments and made it into the 2001 Australian Open, where she lost in the first round to 16th seed Amy Frazier.

Her WTA main draw appearances included the 2000 Paris Indoor, where she had a win in qualifying over Elena Dementieva.

She reached a highest ranking of 132 in the world and won six singles titles on the ITF circuit.

ITF Circuit finals

Singles (6–2)
{|
|-valign=top
|

References

External links
 
 

1973 births
Living people
French female tennis players
Sportspeople from Ardennes (department)